Yearim Productions Co., Ltd., founded in 1991, is a full service 2D (including digital animation) Korean animation studio located in Seoul, South Korea with a satellite office in Los Angeles.

Shows

Films

Tom and Jerry: The Fast and the Furry (2005)
Peanuts: Happiness Is a Warm Blanket, Charlie Brown (2010)
Two Dreadful Children – Pilot (2007)
Down The Tubes – Pilot (2007)
TV Spot for World Cup (2006)
Me, Eloise (2006)
The Karate Guard (2005)
Baby Looney Tunes (2002–2005)
PSA: Daffy Duck For President (2004)
Walmart: Commercial Spot (2003)
Free for All (2003)
The Freshman (2002)
Channel Umptee-3 (1997)
Extreme Ghostbusters (1997)

References

South Korean animation studios
Mass media companies established in 1991
South Korean companies established in 1991